Cyphochlaena is a genus of plants in the grass family native to certain islands in the Indian Ocean.

 Species
 Cyphochlaena madagascariensis Hack. - Comoros, Madagascar
 Cyphochlaena sclerioides (A.Camus) Bosser - Madagascar

References

Poaceae genera
Panicoideae
Taxa named by Eduard Hackel